Prairie Law is a 1940 American Western film directed by David Howard from a screenplay by Doris Schroeder and Arthur V. Jones, based on a story by Bernard McConville. Released on June 14, 1940, the film was produced and distributed by RKO Radio Pictures and stars George O'Brien, Virginia Vale, and Dick Hogan.

Plot summary

Cast
 George O'Brien as Brill Austin
 Virginia Vale as Priscilla Brambull
 Dick Hogan as Larry Brambull
 J. Farrell MacDonald as Sheriff Jim Austin
 Slim Whitaker as Silent
 Cy Kendall as Pete Gore (as Cyrus W. Kendall)
 Paul Everton as Judge Ben Curry
 Henry Hall as Franklin Brambull
 Monte Montague as Sam Sully
 Quen Ramsey as Murph

References

External links
 
 
 
 

American Western (genre) films
1940 Western (genre) films
1940 films
RKO Pictures films
Films produced by Bert Gilroy
Films directed by David Howard
American black-and-white films
Films scored by Paul Sawtell
1940s American films